Neemrana is an ancient historical town in Alwar district of Rajasthan, India,  from Alwar city,  from New Delhi and  from Jaipur on the Delhi-Jaipur highway in Neemrana tehsil. It is between Behror and Shahajahanpur. Neemrana is an industrial hub.It is the site of a 15th-century hill-fort occupied by Chauhans till 1947. The erstwhile ruling family is considered to be of the direct lineage of Prithviraj Chauhan. Some distance from Neemrana is another fort,  Kesroli in Alwar district, that is one of the oldest heritage sites. Historians trace it to the Matsya Janapada of the Mahabharata times. In Kesroli one gets to see the oldest remains of Buddhist Vihara at Viratnagar where the Pandavas spent the last year of their exile incognito; Pandupole, with the only reclining statue of Hanuman; the samadhi of the ruler saint Bhartrihari.

Rulers of Neemrana
The Rajas of Nimrana belong to the Sankat sub-clan and Kharak family of the Chauhan clan. Rao Rajdeo, Rao of Nimrana was the founding Raja of Neerana in 1464. He was the 6th in descent from Rao Madan Pal, founder of Mandawar in 1170. The rulers have included:

 Raja Tehri Singh
 Raja Bhim Singh
 Raja Mukand Singh
 Raja Janak Singh (1885-1931)
 Raja Rao Saheb Umrao Singh (1932-1945)
 Raja Rajendra Singhji Sahib (1946-recent)
The state of Nimrana from 1885 to 1907 was managed by a political agent during the younger years of Raja Janak Singh and Raja Janak Singh was granted full ruling powers in February 1907. During this period Ladha Singh Bhatia was installed as the Wazir of Neemrana.

Industry

The Rajasthan government, through Rajasthan Industrial Cooperation RIICO, has developed industrial zones in various stages in Neemrana in Alwar district in the past several years. Apart from the usual industrial areas, the Export Promotion Industrial Park (EPIP) and the Japanese Industrial Zone in Majra Kath are particularly noteworthy. Companies from India and abroad have set up their units in these industrial areas and many more new industries are arriving, creating new employment opportunities. The Japanese industrial zone developed by RIICO is an extension of a previously existing industrial zone. The Korean Zone is also coming up the silver wood township.

Education

Neemrana is the site of Saint Margaret Engineering College, which was established in 2002, and

NIIT University, which won the India Today award for the Greenest Campus.

Raffles University,

School of Aeronautics (Neemrana) is one of the best aviation colleges in India, with good placements. One Govt polytechnic college and Rao Sohanlal College for UG Courses are also located at Neemrana.

Cambay Institute of Hospitality Management, Neemrana, under Neesa Group, is one of the best institutes in India for making a career in hotel management, and is attached to the luxury hotel Cambay Sapphire so that students can obtain practical exposure. CIHM branches are also in Jaipur - Kukas, Udaipur City and Gandhinagar Gujarat.

Neemrana also contains various schools such as 
MDVM Parle School, VIP School, Raath international school, nav adarsh.

Real estate and commerce
The massive industrial growth, along with ambitious plans to make Neemrana a knowledge city with 38 upcoming universities, has given a major push to real estate in this region. Professionals moving for job opportunities and the student inflow will lead to a high demand for residential options. Many noteworthy builders are already present in the area. Projects are being launched keeping the needs and lifestyle of the Japanese and Korean expats in mind. Many hotels are also opening up, and the existing ones have started to turn their offerings to appeal to the many Japanese working there. Various residencial societies are there in Neemrana such as Eldeco Hill Side, Eldeco Eden Park, Aashiaana Greens and others.

References

External links

 
Forts in Rajasthan
Cities and towns in Alwar district